Bunnell Run is a stream in the U.S. state of West Virginia.

Bunnell Run has the name of John Bunnell, a pioneer who settled there around 1800.

See also
List of rivers of West Virginia

References

Rivers of Ritchie County, West Virginia
Rivers of West Virginia